Echinolittorina pascua is a species of sea snail, a marine gastropod mollusk in the family Littorinidae, the winkles or periwinkles.

Description
The shell grows to a length of 15 mm

Distribution
This species is distributed in the Pacific Ocean along Easter Island

References

 Reid, D.G. (1989a) The comparative morphology, phylogeny and evolution of the gastropod family Littorinidae. Philosophical Transactions of the Royal Society of London, Series B 324: 1–110.
 Williams, S.T. & Reid, D.G. (2004) Speciation and diversity on tropical rocky shores: a global phylogeny of snails of the genus Echinolittorina. Evolution 58(10):2227-2251
 Reid D.G. (2007). The genus Echinolittorina Habe, 1956 (Gastropoda: Littorinidae) in the Indo-West Pacific Ocean. Zootaxa 1420.

External links
 

Littorinidae
Gastropods described in 1970